is a town located in Shiribeshi Subprefecture, Hokkaido, Japan.

As of September 2016, the town has an estimated population of 4,893, and a density of 11 persons per km2. The total area is 449.68 km2.

Geography
Shiribetsu River flows through Rankoshi to the Sea of Japan. The town is surrounded by Niseko Volcanic Group, which belongs to Niseko-Shakotan-Otaru Kaigan Quasi-National Park.

The name is derived from Ainu word "Ranko-usi", meaning "Place with many Katsura trees". 
Mountains: Mount Raiden, Mount Mekunnai, Mount Chisenupuri, Mount Nitonupuri

Neighboring towns
 Shiribeshi Subprefecture
 Suttsu
 Kuromatsunai
 Kutchan
 Niseko
 Iwanai
 Iburi Subprefecture
 Toyoura

Climate

History
1909: Minamishiribeshi became a Second Class Village.
1940: Minamishiribeshi became a First Class Village.
1954: Minamishiribeshi Village became Rankoshi Town.
1955: A part of Suttsu Town was merged into Rankoshi Town.

Education
 High school
 Hokkaido Rankoshi High School
 Junior high school
 Rankoshi Junior High School
 Elementary schools
 Rankoshi Elementary School
 Kombu Elementary School

Transportation
 Hakodate Main Line: Mena - Rankoshi - Konbu
 Route 5

Sister city
  Saalfelden, Salzburg, Austria (since 1967)

References

External links

Official Website 

Towns in Hokkaido